The Stazione Sperimentale Carta, Cartoni e Paste per Carta (SSCCP) (Pulp and Paper Experimental Station) is a special Agency of the Chamber of Commerce in Milan.
It is an Institute for applied research, established in Milan, and operating on a national scale with the specific aim of promoting the technical and technological progress in the pulp, paper and derived products industry. In 1999 SSCCP was transformed into a public economic institution with important legal, operational and administrative modifications which, however, have left its mission and functions unchanged.

See also
Stazione Sperimentale per le Industrie degli Oli e dei Grassi
Stazione Sperimentale per la Seta
Stazione Sperimentale per i Combustibili

References

External links
Homepage of the SSCCP 

Experimental Stations for Industry in Italy
Economy of Milan